Yumilka Daysi Ruíz Luaces (born 8 May 1978 in Camagüey) is a retired volleyball player from Cuba, who represented her native country in four consecutive Summer Olympics, starting in 1996. She twice won a gold medal with the national team in 1996 and 2000; she also claimed the bronze at the 2004 Summer Olympics in Athens, Greece.

Career
She played the 2004/05 season with the Russian club Uralochka-NTMK, where she set the record of scoring 53 points in a single match.

She retired in 2008 aged 30. At 1.79m the outside hitter had a jumping power reaching 3.28m.

In August 2008 she was elected as a member of the International Olympic Committee by the 120th IOC Session.

After three years of inactivity Ruiz made a comeback in 2012 to play in Russian League for Uralochka-NTMK Ekaterinburg and participated in the European Champions League.

Clubs
  Medinex Reggio Calabria (1996–2000)
  Ciudad Habana (2000–2006)
  Uralochka-NTMK (2004–2005)
  Camagüey (2006–2008)
  Uralochka-NTMK (2012–2014)

Awards

Individuals
 2002 Pan-American Cup "Most Valuable Player"
 2002 World Championship "Best Scorer"
 2003 NORCECA Championship "Most Valuable Player"
 2004 FIVB World Grand Prix "Best Spiker"
 2005 Pan-American Cup "Best Spiker"
 2004/2005 Russian Super League "Most Valuable Player"

Clubs
 1998 CEV Cup –  Runner-up, with Medinex Reggio Calabria
 1999 Italian Cup –  Runner-up, with Medinex Reggio Calabria
 1998-99 Italian Championship –  Runner-up, with Medinex Reggio Calabria
 1999-00 Italian Championship –  Runner-up, with Medinex Reggio Calabria
 2000 Italian Cup –  Champion, with Medinex Reggio Calabria
 2000 Italian Super Cup –  Champion, with Medinex Reggio Calabria
 2000 CEV Cup –  Champion, with Medinex Reggio Calabria
 2004-05 Russian Super League –  Champion, with Uralochka-NTMK

References

External links
 
 FIVB profile
 Uralochka-NTMK profile
 Medinex profile
 

1978 births
Living people
Cuban women's volleyball players
Volleyball players at the 1996 Summer Olympics
Volleyball players at the 2000 Summer Olympics
Volleyball players at the 2004 Summer Olympics
Volleyball players at the 2008 Summer Olympics
Olympic gold medalists for Cuba
Olympic bronze medalists for Cuba
Olympic volleyball players of Cuba
Olympic medalists in volleyball
Volleyball players at the 2003 Pan American Games
Volleyball players at the 2007 Pan American Games
Pan American Games silver medalists for Cuba
Pan American Games gold medalists for Cuba
Sportspeople from Havana
International Olympic Committee members
Medalists at the 2004 Summer Olympics
Medalists at the 2000 Summer Olympics
Medalists at the 1996 Summer Olympics
Pan American Games medalists in volleyball
Central American and Caribbean Games silver medalists for Cuba
Competitors at the 2006 Central American and Caribbean Games
Outside hitters
Cuban expatriates in Italy
Cuban expatriates in Russia
Central American and Caribbean Games medalists in volleyball
Expatriate volleyball players in Italy
Expatriate volleyball players in Russia
Medalists at the 2003 Pan American Games
Medalists at the 2007 Pan American Games
Sportspeople from Camagüey
21st-century Cuban women
20th-century Cuban women